Waltonia  may refer to:
 Waltonia (brachiopod), a brachiopod genus in the family Terebratellidae
 Waltonia (fungus), a fungus genus in the family Dermateaceae